Schutt is a surname. Alternative spellings are Schütt and Schuet. People with these names include:

Schutt
Arthur Schutt (1902–1965), American jazz pianist and arranger
Christine Schutt (born 1948), American novelist and short story writer
Debra Schutt (born 1955), American set decorator
Ellen Isham Schutt (1873–1955), American botanical illustrator
George Schutt (1833–?), Union Navy sailor in the American Civil War
Helen Macpherson Schutt (1874–1951), Australian philanthropist
John Schutt (born 1948), American mountaineer, geologist, and explorer
Schutt Glacier, Antarctic glacier named after him
Kate Schutt (born 1975), American singer and songwriter
Megan Schutt (born 1993), Australian cricketer
Rod Schutt (born 1956), Canadian ice hockey player
Scott Schutt (born 1963), American football player
Stephen D. Schutt (born 1954), American college president
Will Schutt (born 1981), American poet
Schütt
Eduard Schütt (1856–1933), Russian composer, pianist, and conductor
Roland Schütt (1913–2005), Swedish author
Schuett
Gordon W. Schuett (born 1957),  an American evolutionary biologist and herpetologist

See also 
 Schut, a Dutch surname
 Schutte, a Dutch and German surname
 Schutt, Ontario, small town in NE Ontario
 Schutt Sports, American sports equipment company